The Scottish Archaeological Journal is a peer-reviewed academic journal of the archaeology of Scotland. It is published by Edinburgh University Press and was previously known as the Transactions of the Glasgow Archaeological Society (1859 to 1967) and the Glasgow Archaeological Journal (1969 to 1991).

See also
 Glasgow Archaeological Society

References

External links

Archaeology of Scotland
Archaeology journals
Edinburgh University Press academic journals
Publications established in 1859
British history journals